Joseph Corbett Jr. (October 25, 1928 – August 24, 2009) was an American fugitive, murderer, and prison escapee who, in 1960, was placed on the FBI's 10 most wanted list after  kidnapping and murdering Adolph Coors III, heir to the Coors beer fortune.

A native of Seattle, Corbett was arrested in Canada after spending seven months on the run. He was convicted of murdering Coors and sentenced to life imprisonment. Eventually released on parole, Corbett died by suicide in 2009.

Background
Corbett was convicted of shooting a man in the back of the head in 1951, which he claimed was self-defense. Corbett was placed in a maximum-security prison and due to good behavior, he was later transferred to minimum security, from which he then escaped.

On the morning of February 9, 1960, Adolph Coors III, the 45-year-old CEO and chairman of the board of the Coors brewery, left his house for work, but never arrived. A delivery man found Coors' station wagon abandoned, and blood droplets were found nearby. Corbett was implicated, and the FBI began a manhunt that spanned from California to Atlantic City, New Jersey, and eventually to Vancouver, British Columbia, Canada. In March 1960, the FBI added Corbett to its Ten Most Wanted list.

On September 11, 1960, Coors' remains were found in the local forest, with two bullet wounds in his back.

Corbett was arrested October 29, 1960 in Vancouver by Canadian police. The FBI had issued wanted poster-style photo copies, and a woman called in, stating a man of his description was in her area. Afterwards, the Vancouver police saw his car parked outside a motor inn. He was extradited back to the U.S. Since the kidnap and murder occurred in Colorado, the state charged Corbett with murder.

On March 29, 1961, Corbett was convicted of first-degree murder and sentenced to life imprisonment. He was paroled and released from prison on December 12, 1980.

In 1996 Corbett gave his only interview following his release from prison; in it, he maintained his innocence.

Corbett committed suicide by a single gunshot wound in the head on August 24, 2009.

References

External links
A Look Back at the Coors Kidnapping Case (FBI)

1928 births
2009 suicides
American kidnappers
American people convicted of murder
American prisoners sentenced to life imprisonment
Fugitives
People convicted of murder by Colorado
People paroled from life sentence
Prisoners sentenced to life imprisonment by Colorado
Suicides by firearm in Colorado
2009 deaths